Swarland Old Hall is a small 17th-century country house at Swarland, Northumberland, England. It is a Grade II* listed building.

The Manor of Swarland was owned from before the time of the Norman Conquest by the de Haslerigg family. The house which has a four-bay south front and two storeys with attics was built in the late 17th century and incorporates fabric of earlier properties. The east front is notable for its castellated full height screen wall with three blind Gothic arches.

A railed monument nearby (Grade II listed) records the death of William Haslerigg in 1681. His brother and heir was High Sheriff of Northumberland in 1698.

The estate was acquired by Richard Grieve in 1741. His son Davison Richard Grieve (High Sheriff of Northumberland in 1788) engaged architect John Carr to build a new mansion (Swarland Hall) nearby. The new house, later the home of Alexander Davison was demolished in the 1930s.

The old hall passed through many owners. It is currently offered by its present owners as self-catering holiday accommodation.

References

External links
 Swarland Hall entry from The DiCamillo Companion to British & Irish Country Houses

Grade II* listed buildings in Northumberland
Country houses in Northumberland